Schleuniger (pronounced SHLOI-NI-GER) is a technology company and a supplier to the wire processing industry. With its subsidiary DiIT, Schleuniger is in involved in digitalization and industrial IoT.

Most of the Schleuniger Group's customers are suppliers to the automotive, entertainment and information industries as well as for the communications sector. The company has development and production locations in Switzerland, Germany and China. 

The Schleuniger Group represents the wire processing business segment of the publicly listed Metall Zug Group and has more than 900 employees and 40 apprentices worldwide.

History 
The history of the Schleuniger Group as it is known today started in 1991 when Dr. Gerhard Jansen (Chairman BOD until 2009) and Martin Strehl (CEO until 2009) acquired Sutter Electronic AG located in Thun, Switzerland. At that time Sutter Electronic AG had 30 employees and generated a revenue of 5 million CHF with wire processing machines and other processing equipment. In 1993 the new owners acquired Schleuniger Productronic AG, which had been founded in Solothurn, Switzerland. This company also produced wire processing machines, but additionally had access to the international market. Both companies were then integrated into a group under the already internationally established name "Schleuniger". In 1999, the Schleuniger Group took over their previously independent distributor "L+H Kabeltechnik" and secured direct access to Germany - its most important European market. Taking over the Swiss-based Kirsten AG in 2000 opened the crimping market for the Schleuniger Group and two years later Schleuniger entered the market for Plastic Optical Fiber (POF) and Flat Foil Cables (FFC / FPC) with the foundation of Schleuniger Flexon AG in 2002. Another 2 years later, Schleuniger took over the activities of the German "Grote+Hartmann Engineering GmbH" (GHWE) from the American Lear Corporation Inc., and developed fully automatic crimping machines, which are now produced by Schleuniger Automation GmbH in Radevormwald, Germany. Having been active in China through an independent representative for many years, Schleuniger opened a representative office in Shanghai in 2005, which was transformed into a trading company in 2007. In 2008, the Swiss Metall Zug Group took over the Schleuniger Group. The same year, Schleuniger took over PAWO Systems AG which became Schleuniger Solutions in 2009. In August 2009, Christoph Schüpbach succeeded Martin Strehl as CEO and Calvin Grieder succeeded Gerhard Jansen as Chairman in November 2009. A substantial investment was made in 2013 with the acquisition of the former Tianjin Haofeng Electrical Equipment Co., Ltd. headquartered in Tianjin, China. The new owners integrated the newly founded Schleuniger Haofeng (Tianjin) Machinery Co., Ltd. into the Schleuniger Group. Schleuniger Haofeng produces high-quality machinery for the wire processing industry. Prior to their acquisition, Tianjin Haofeng Electrical Equipment's 2012 posted sales were the equivalent of approx. 5 million Swiss Francs. Another acquisition was completed in Spring 2015 when the Cirris Solutions GmbH, headquartered in Jettingen/Germany became part of the Schleuniger Group. Due to its fully automated testing systems, Cirris Solutions is one of the global leaders in the field of applied testing technology and testing automation. Cirris Solutions GmbH has approximately 40 employees and generated translated sales of 7.2 million Swiss Francs in 2014 (currency exchange rate from Dec. 31, 2014).

Dates 
 1975: Foundation of Sutter Electronic AG, Thun, Switzerland
 1991: Acquisition of Sutter Electronic AG, Thun, Switzerland by Gerhard Jansen and Martin Strehl
 1993: Acquisition of Schleuniger Productronic AG, Solothurn, Switzerland with operations in Switzerland, USA, and Japan
 1993: Formation of the Schleuniger Group under the roof of Schleuniger Holding AG with Schleuniger AG (Thun, Switzerland), Schleuniger, Inc. (Manchester, USA) and Schleuniger Japan Co., Ltd. (Tokyo, Japan)
 1999: Acquisition of L+H Kabeltechnik GmbH, Neuhausen/Enzkreis, Germany (company renamed "Schleuniger GmbH" in 2001)
 2000: Acquisition of Rawyler AG, Bruegg, Switzerland and merger with Schleuniger AG
 2000: Acquisition of Kirsten AG, Welschenrohr, Switzerland (renamed "Schleuniger CrimpTec AG" in 2001)
 2002: Foundation of Schleuniger Flexon AG, Horgen, Switzerland
 2004: Acquisition of Grote & Hartmann Engineering GmbH activities and foundation of Schleuniger Automation GmbH, Radevormwald, Germany
 2005: Merger of Schleuniger Flexon AG and Schleuniger CrimpTec AG with Schleuniger AG
 2005: Opening of a Representative Office in Shanghai, China
 2007: Foundation of Schleuniger Trading (Shanghai) Co., Ltd., Shanghai, China
 2008: METALL ZUG GROUP, Zug, Switzerland, takes over the Schleuniger Group
 2008: Acquisition of PAWO Systems AG, Unterägeri, Switzerland (company renamed "Schleuniger Solutions AG" in 2009)
 2009: Christoph Schüpbach succeeds Martin Strehl as CEO of the Schleuniger Group
 2009: Calvin Grieder succeeds Gerhard Jansen as Chairman of the Board of Directors of Schleuniger Holding
 2010: Merger of both Schleuniger companies in Germany, Schleuniger Automation AG in Radevormwald and Schleuniger GmbH in Heimsheim. The new Schleuniger GmbH is headquartered in Radevormwald
 2012: Schleuniger acquires 35% of DiIT AG (Disconsult Information Technology), headquartered in Krailing, Germany. DiIT is the leading provider of MES software for wire harness production
 2012: Jürg Werner becomes CEO of Metall Zug AG and Chairman of the Board of Directors of Schleuniger Holding
 2012: Schleuniger CEO Christoph Schüpbach is elected as a member of the Senior Management of Metall Zug AG
 2013: Schleuniger Solution AG becomes the Business Unit Solution of Schleuniger AG
 2013: The assets in Tianjin Haofeng Electrical Equipment Co. were purchased and transferred to the newly founded Schleuniger Haofeng (Tianjin) Machinery Co., Ltd.
 2013: Schleuniger and Telsonic Ultrasonics, Bronschhofen, Switzerland agree on strategic cooperation. Telsonic is a leader in ultrasonic technology
 2014: Schleuniger and Emdep, Alió (Tarragona), Spain agree on strategic cooperation. Emdep is a leading supplier of control equipment and test boards for automobile wiring
 2015: Schleuniger acquires Cirris Solutions GmbH, headquartered in Jettingen/Germany. Cirris Solutions specializes in the production of testing applications for the field of sensor and data transmission cables and for electromechanical components.
 2015: Schleuniger and Cirris Systems Corp, Salt Lake City, USA agree on strategic cooperation. Cirris Systems provides a range of testers, software, adapters, and other tools to fulfill electrical cable testing needs.
 2016: Schleuniger acquires a 20 percent share of Laser Wire Solutions Ltd., Pontypridd, UK. Both companies agree upon worldwide cooperation. Laser Wire Solutions is a company that offers lasers for wire processing, in particular for the wire and jacket stripping processes.
 2017: Schleuniger acquires DiIT AG. Schleuniger already held a minority interest in DiIT AG, a producer of software for wire processing and wiring harness production, prior to taking full ownership. As of January 1, 2017 the previous majority stakeholder and company founder, Dr. Gerhard Schaub, sold all of his shares to Schleuniger and left the company at his own request.
 2018: Schleuniger acquires majority stake (60%) in adaptronic Prüftechnik GmbH
 2022: Schleuniger merges with Komax Corporation. 
Manufacturing companies of Switzerland
Swiss brands